Restraint: A New Foundation for U.S. Grand Strategy is a book that was written by Dr. Barry Posen and published in 2014 by Cornell University Press. Posen is the Ford International Professor of Political Science and director of the Security Studies Program at the Massachusetts Institute of Technology (MIT).

Grand strategy

Posen defines grand strategy as "a state's 'theory about how to produce security for itself.'" Posen describes the current debate about American grand strategy as being between two main philosophies: liberal hegemony and restraint.

The first half of the book addresses liberal hegemony. Liberal hegemony is defined as "an activist grand strategy that aims to assertively maintain U.S. dominance and the 'unipolar moment' in the service of liberalism and national security," Posen argues that liberal hegemony is the grand strategy that the United States has followed since the end of the Cold War and that it has been a failure, calling it "unnecessary, counterproductive, costly, and wasteful."

In the second half of the book, Posen explains why restraint would be a better grand strategy to follow than liberal hegemony. He details what the strategy would look like and what sort of military would be needed to achieve this.

Reception
Reviewer William Ruger, writing in The American Conservative, called the book the "defining treatise" for supporters of restraint.

International relations scholars Hugo Meijer and Stephen G. Brooks have challenged Posen's claim that Europe will develop its own capable defense forces if the U.S. withdrew from Europe.

References

External links
 Restraint at Archive.org
 A New U.S. Grand Strategy - op-ed in The Boston Review by Barry Posen
 The Case for Restraint - American Interest article
Restraining Order by Barry Posen in The American Interest
 A Realist's Guide to Grand Strategy - book review in The American Conservative
 America Doesn't Need to Lead the Free World - Interview in The Atlantic with Barry Posen about his book
 The Moral Argument for American Restraint - in Iraq and Beyond - The Atlantic review of the book
 Roundtable on Restraint: A New Foundation for U.S. Grand Strategy at H-Diplo
 Restraint: A New Foundation for U.S. Grand Strategy - book event with the Cato Institute

2014 non-fiction books
American non-fiction books
Cornell University Press books